Azizbekovo may refer to:
 Əzizbəyov, Goranboy, Azerbaijan
Basqal, Azerbaijan